Sphaceloma poinsettiae is a fungal plant pathogen. It causes poinsettia scab, which is a spot anthracnose disease.

References

External links
 USDA ARS Fungal Database

Fungal plant pathogens and diseases
Ornamental plant pathogens and diseases
Myriangiales
Fungi described in 1942